I Want it to Be Real is a 1984, solo, dance single by John Rocca, lead vocalist and founder of the London, dance group, Freeez.  It scored to number one on the dance charts.

See also
 John Rocca

References

1984 singles
1984 songs